Guangtian (光天) was a Chinese era name used by several emperors of China. It may refer to:

Guangtian (918), era name used by Wang Jian (Former Shu), emperor of Former Shu
Guangtian (942–943), era name used by Liu Bin (Southern Han), emperor of Southern Han
Caleb Liu's Dad